The 2014 South American Artistic Gymnastics Championships were held in Cochabamba, Bolivia December 9–15, 2014. The competition was organized by the Bolivian Gymnastics Federation and approved by the International Gymnastics Federation. This was the 13th edition of the South American Artistic Gymnastics Championships for senior gymnasts.

Participating nations

Medalists

Medal table

References

2014 in gymnastics
South American Gymnastics Championships
International gymnastics competitions hosted by Bolivia
2014 in Bolivian sport